July Moyo (born 7 May 1950) is a Zimbabwean parliamentarian and member of Zanu-PF. He has been a member of cabinet in both Robert Mugabe and Emmerson Mnangagwa governments. Moyo is currently the Minister of Local Government, Public Works and National Housing.

Political career
In 1999, Moyo was appointed the Governor of Midlands.

In July 2000, Moyo was appointed the Minister of Public Service, Labour and Social Welfare in Robert Mugabe's government, a position he held until Feb 2004. 

He was placed on the United States sanctions list from 2003 to 2005.

In February 2004, Robert Mugabe appointed Moyo to be the country's Minister of Energy and Power Development. He held the position until April 2005.

When Emmerson Mnangagwa came to power in November 2017, Moyo was returned to cabinet to lead the Ministry of Local Government, Public Works and National Housing.

References 

Zimbabwean people
ZANU–PF politicians
Living people
1950 births